Syntrichura virens is a moth in the subfamily Arctiinae. It was first described by Arthur Gardiner Butler in 1876. It is found in Brazil (São Paulo), Panama and Colombia.

Subspecies
Syntrichura virens virens (Brazil)
Syntrichura virens reba Druce, 1896 (Panama, Colombia)

References

Arctiidae genus list at Butterflies and Moths of the World of the Natural History Museum

Moths described in 1876
Arctiinae